The president of France is the head of state of France. The first officeholder is considered to be Louis-Napoléon Bonaparte, who was elected in 1848 and provoked the 1851 self-coup to later proclaim himself emperor as Napoleon III. His coup, which proved popular as he sought the restoration of universal male suffrage previously abolished by the legislature, granted the newly established Second Empire firm ground.

A republican regime was given way again in 1870 through the Third Republic, after the fall of Napoleon III. A 1962 referendum held under the Fifth Republic at the request of President Charles de Gaulle transferred the election of the president of France from an electoral college to a popular vote. Since then, ten presidential elections have taken place. The 25th and current officeholder has been Emmanuel Macron since 14 May 2017.

French First Republic (1792–1804)

National Convention

The National Convention (20 September 1792 – 26 October 1795) was led by the President of the National Convention; the presidency rotated fortnightly.

From 1793 the National Convention was dominated by its Committee of Public Safety, in which the leading figures were Georges Danton and then Maximilien Robespierre.

Directory

The Directory was officially led by a president, as stipulated by Article 141 of the Constitution of the Year III. An entirely ceremonial post, the first president was Rewbell who was chosen by lot on 2 November 1795. The Directors conducted their elections privately, with the presidency rotating every three months. The last President was Gohier.

The leading figure of the Directory was Paul Barras, the only director to serve throughout the Directory.

Political parties

Consulate

French Second Republic (1848–1852)

President of the Provisional Government of the Republic

Political parties

President of the Executive Commission

Political parties

Chief of the Executive Power

Political parties

President of the Republic
Political parties

Louis-Napoléon Bonaparte proclaimed himself Emperor of the French in 1852, reigning as Emperor Napoleon III 1852–1870 (Second French Empire).

French Third Republic (1870–1940)

President of the Government of National Defense

Political parties

Chief of the Executive Power
Political parties

Presidents of the Republic
Political parties

The office of President of the French Republic did not exist from 1940 until 1947.

French State (1940–1944)

Chief of State

Free France (1940–1944)

President of the French National Committee

Provisional Government of the French Republic (1944–1946)

Chairmen of the Provisional Government

Political parties

French Fourth Republic (1946–1958)

Presidents
Political parties

French Fifth Republic (1958–present)

Presidents
Political parties:

Timeline

Notes:
1 Louis-Napoléon Bonaparte was proclaimed Emperor on 2 December 1852, ending the French Second Republic, and his presidency.
2 Adolphe Thiers previously served in the executive position of Chief of the Executive Power from 17 February 1871 until 30 August 1871, his presidency then beginning the following day on 31 August 1871.
3 Philippe Pétain used the title Chief of the French State as opposed to President of France.
4-6 The heads of state of the Provisional Government of the French Republic (1944-1946), with the exception of Léon Blum and Vincent Auriol, used the title Chairman rather than President. De Gaulle would later assume the title President as the head of state of the French Fifth Republic.
7-8 Vincent Auriol served as the constituent head of state of France as President of the National Assembly from 31 January 1946 until 21 January 1947, but the title was superseded in its executive authority by that of Léon Blum as President of the Provisional Government on 16 December 1946. Auriol was soon after elected President of France himself on 16 January 1947.

See also
List of presidents of France by tenure
List of prime ministers of France

References

French republic
Presidents
Presidents

de:Liste der Staatsoberhäupter Frankreichs#Zweite Republik